The Buffalo Bill Cody Homestead is the boyhood home of Buffalo Bill Cody, a government scout and Wild West showman. The homestead is located in the broad valley of the Wapsipinicon River Valley south of McCausland, Iowa, United States, in rural Scott County. The farmhouse was built in 1847 by Isaac Cody, Buffalo Bill's father, of native limestone and contains walnut floors and trim.

Isaac and Mary Cody, parents of the legendary Buffalo Bill, moved their family to the homestead from LeClaire, Iowa, where Bill was born and raised.

On January 24, 1974, The Cody Homestead was entered to the National Register of Historic Places.

The Iowa Society of The National Society of the Colonial Dames of America owns the furnishings in the 1847 main room and the 1870 bedroom.

Gallery

References

External links
Buffalo Bill Cody Homestead Web Site

Biographical museums in Iowa
Homestead
Farms on the National Register of Historic Places in Iowa
Historic house museums in Iowa
Houses in Scott County, Iowa
Houses on the National Register of Historic Places in Iowa
Museums in Scott County, Iowa
National Register of Historic Places in Scott County, Iowa
National Society of the Colonial Dames of America
Houses completed in 1847
1847 establishments in Iowa